Cork Premier Under-21 A Hurling Championship (currently known for sponsorship reasons as the Evening Echo Cork County Premier Under-21 A Hurling Championship) is an annual hurling competition organised by the Cork County Board of the Gaelic Athletic Association since 1973 for the top tier under-21 hurling teams in the county of Cork in Ireland.

The series of games are played from the summer to the winter months with the county final currently being played at Páirc Uí Rinn. The prize for the winning team is the Dick Barrett Cup. The championship uses a double elimination format whereby each team is guaranteed at least two games.

22 clubs currently participate in the Premier Under-21 Championship. The title has been won at least once by 16 different clubs. The all-time record-holders are Midleton, who have won six championship titles.

Fr. O'Neill's are the 2018 title-holders after defeating Midleton GAA by 3-24 to 4-18 (AET) in the final.

History

Beginnings
The All-Ireland Under-21 Hurling Championship at inter-county level was created in 1964 and had proved successful in bridging the gap between the minor and senior grades. In 1973 the Cork County Board developed their own under-21 championship. It was the fifth county championship to be created in Cork, after the senior, intermediate, junior and minor championships.

Team dominance
Due to the limited time frame that players compete in the grade, it has been difficult for individual clubs to dominate the championship. In spite of this, several clubs have enjoyed limited dominance over the years. Between 1990 and 1994 St. Finbarr's dominated the championship with much of the same team by winning four championships in five seasons. Newtownshandrum ended the century by winning three successive championships between 1998 and 2000. The first decade of the new century saw Erin's Own dominate by winning three championships between 2002 and 2005. Blackrock enjoyed a sustained period of dominance by winning three championships from five successive final appearances between 2012 and 2016.

Formats used
From 1973 until 2015 the championship used a divisional format. The seven respective champions from Avondhu, Carbery, Carrigdhoun, Duhallow, Imokilly, Muskerry and Seandún contested the county championship. That county-wide championship used a single elimination format whereby once a team lost they were eliminated. In 2016 the under-21 championship underwent a major restructuring whereby the divisional system for the top tier was abolished and the strongest 22 clubs entered a new countywide championship.

Sponsorship
Since 2005 the Premier Under-21 Championship has been sponsored by the Evening Echo. The competition was previously sponsored by TSB Bank.

Roll of honour

Roll of honour

Premier 2 Under-21 Hurling Championship

Under-21 A Hurling Championship

Under-21 B Hurling Championship
This competition is confined to clubs who compete at the B level in each of the regional divisions in County Cork. The winners are presented with the Gene Fitzgerald Cup. This cup commemorates Gene Fitzgerald, the former politician who also had administrative positions with Cork GAA County Board.

References

Sources
 Cork Under-21 Hurling Final results
 Cork GAA - A History 1886-1986  Jim Cronin

Hurling competitions in County Cork